The Austin Sixteen Light Six is a British car that was made by Austin from 1927. Announced in October 1927, the first deliveries were planned for March 1928.

To distinguish the car from the smaller engined models in the range a plated Austin Six script was fixed to the radiator grille.

1927
The Austin Sixteen was introduced as a medium saloon sitting within Austin's range above the Seven and Twelve models but still much smaller than the 3.6 Litre Twenty.

The six-cylinder engine was new but had similarities to the engine fitted to the Twenty with its timing chain at the rear of the block. The design was up to date with the gearbox mounted in-unit with the engine and semi elliptic springs all round for the suspension. Triplex safety glass was fitted to all front screens from March 1929.

A wide range of body types was available at first but was simplified over the years.  The coupés went first in 1930 followed by the Weymann type fabric saloons in 1931.

1934
In August 1933 various improvements were announced for 1934 models. The gearbox gained synchromesh on 3rd and 4th gears and an alternative  larger (2511 cc) 18 hp engine was made available at no extra charge.  An early automatic gearbox was available between 1934 and 1936 but few sold. A longer  wheelbase chassis became an option.

Of this version 5742 16s and 2630 18s were made.

Hayes selfselector transmission
"This provides a drive which is automatic in variation of ratio within limits, easily set by a finger and thumb lever on the top of the steering wheel. The actual transmission is through steel rollers which transmit the drive between curved steel races, the ratio being altered by rocking the rollers to different driving positions to engage with differing diameters of the driving and driven races. There are no gears—except for reverse—and a wide variation in ratios is available automatically. The driving rollers are rocked or precessed to give varying ratios by hydraulic means and the driver by his little lever can modify the  performance as road conditions require. Subject to the control setting, the automatic functioning ensures a constant engine speed whatever the tractive resistance met with on the road, the transmission varying its ratio to balance the resistance as it increases or decreases. The engine speed by creating oil pressure in the hydraulic control system, tends to precess the rollers to give a high ratio drive. This is counterbalanced by the reaction of the tractive resistance, which tends to give a low ratio precession. A valve worked by the movement of the forward and reverse lever which engages the drive —in the ordinary way and is centrally placed like the ordinary speed lever—releases the pressure in the hydraulic control unit when the lever is in its neutral and reverse positions, so that the drive is always at low ratio for starting from rest or reversing.

"The finger and thumb control lever works in a small quadrant which is marked at the top "Traffic" then "High" and at the bottom "Low" and finally "Cold" with spaces in between. Variations of this lever govern engine speeds. The forward, neutral and reverse positions for the central hand lever are stepped. To start the car from rest a driver presses out his clutch, moves his hand lever forward, and lets in the clutch in the ordinary way with slight acceleration. Thereafter the whole of the drive is done with the accelerator pedal, the accelerator allowing the engine to run up and keep constant maximum speed governed by the control lever on the top of the steering wheel by which engine braking power can also be regulated. When the accelerator is pressed after being released the effect is rather similar to that with a free wheel in use, in that the engine picks up to the speed that is suitable to the drive. The engine is available as a brake, and greater power of this kind can be had by moving the control lever down towards low"Motoring correspondent, The Times

1935
Further upgrades were made in 1935. The body range was simplified and now had only the 5 and 7 seat saloons. Externally the most obvious change was to the radiator surround which was painted body colour rather than chrome plated, and a small external boot was added to the rear which contained the spare wheel. Synchromesh was added to second gear. The larger engine was modified to have only four rather than eight main bearings.

1937
In 1937, the last year this car was made, the smaller engined Sixteen was dropped and pressed steel road wheels replaced the previously fitted wire wheels.

Between 1935 and 1937 12,731 were produced.

Performance
The 16 hp engined car could reach  and return  depending on the body fitted.

Catalogue 1927 to 1937
The first name for this car was Austin Sixteen Light Six. In 1930 Light Six was dropped and it was an Austin Sixteen. From 1933 it was deemed necessary to offer an 18 hp engine at no extra charge, in mid 1937 this car's body was replaced by a new shape only available with the 18 hp engine and known as an Austin Eighteen.

Note

References

External links

165
1920s cars
1930s cars
Cars introduced in 1927